is a Mongolian professional sumo wrestler from Ulaanbaatar. He began his professional sumo career in 2017 at the age of twenty three. His highest rank to date has been maegashira 15. He wrestles for the Nishikido stable.

Early life and education
Growing up in Mongolia Turbold was a great athlete participating in many different sports like judo, basketball, darts, and speed skating. He was especially good at speed skating having the ability to win at the district level. For high school Turbold studied abroad in Japan at Tottori Jōhoku High School, this is where he started training in sumo. After graduating from high school he entered Nihon University and their sumo club. In his third year at the university he won the All-Japan Sumo Championship giving him the title of amateur Yokozuna (the first foreigner to do so). The following year he served as the club captain, and won the National Student Sumo Championship and giving him the title of Student Yokozuna (also the first foreigner to do so).

Career

After graduating from university Turbold entered Nishikido stable, recruited by former sekiwake Mitoizumi. His amateur success granted him makushita tsukedashi status, allowing him skip the lower divisions and start at Makushita 15. He started his career with a makekoshi or losing record but quickly rebounded with three consecutive winning records. After this string of winning records he was given sekitori status by being promoted to the jūryō division. He was the first sekitori produced by his stable since its founding in 2002. He started off his jūryō debut with a winning 8–7, he followed this up with another winning record although he had to withdraw the last four days with he injury. The next tournament he was unable to achieve a winning record managing only a 6–9 record. He rebounded to with a 8–7 winning record the following tournament but suffered only his third losing record with a 7–8 finish. He rebounded yet again to get a 9–6 finish. 

He reached jūryō 4 in January 2020. In July 2020 at the rank of jūryō 14 he produced a 10–5 record, losing a playoff for the yūshō or championship to Akua. He won his first jūryō championship in July 2021 with a 12-3 record, and reached jūryō 1 in the following September 2021 tournament, narrowly missing out on promotion to the top makuuchi division.

He was forced to sit out the January 2022 tournament after a member of Nishikido stable tested positive for COVID-19.

In September 2022 Mitoryū reached the top division for the first time at maegashira 16.

Fighting style
Mitoryū is a yotsu-sumo wrestler, preferring grappling techniques to pushing and thrusting. His most common winning kimarite is a straightforward yori kiri, or force out, and he uses a migi-yotsu grip on the mawashi or belt, with his right hand inside and left hand outside his opponent's arms.

Career record

See also
List of sumo tournament second division champions
List of active sumo wrestlers
List of non-Japanese sumo wrestlers
List of heaviest sumo wrestlers

References

External links
 

1994 births
Mongolian sumo wrestlers
Living people